Eduardo Vincente Mirás (14 November 1929 – 24 February 2022) was an Argentine Roman Catholic bishop.

Mirás was born in Argentina and was ordained to the priesthood in 1952. He served as titular bishop of Ambia and as auxiliary bishop of the Roman Catholic Archdiocese of Buenos Aires from 1984 to 1994 and as archbishop of the Roman Catholic Archdiocese of Rosario, Argentina, from 1994 to 2005 when he retired. 

Mirás died from complications of COVID-19 in Rosario, Santa Fe, on 24 February 2022, at the age of 92, during the COVID-19 pandemic in Argentina.

References

1929 births
2022 deaths
20th-century Roman Catholic bishops in Argentina
21st-century Roman Catholic archbishops in Argentina
Roman Catholic archbishops of Rosario
Deaths from the COVID-19 pandemic in Argentina